Frank Holdsworth (15 September 1871 – 4 August 1941) was a New Zealand cricketer who played 12 matches of first-class cricket for Wellington from 1892 to 1903. He was also a lawyer.

Life and career
Holdsworth was a tall, powerfully built right-arm medium-pace bowler whose height enabled him to extract extra bounce from the pitch, and a hard-hitting right-handed tail-end batsman. In Wellington's innings victory over Hawke's Bay in 1896-97 he took 6 for 47 and 6 for 35. Earlier that season he had been Wellington's top scorer against the touring Australians, making 30.

After attending Wellington College and Wanganui Collegiate School, Holdsworth became a lawyer, and practised in Wellington for more than 40 years. He and his wife Winnie had two daughters and two sons.

References

External links
 
 

1871 births
1941 deaths
New Zealand cricketers
Wellington cricketers
Cricketers from Wellington City
20th-century New Zealand lawyers